The Dzhurich is a river in Perm Krai, Russia, a left tributary of the South Keltma. It starts in the extreme north of Perm Krai, in Cherdynsky District, near the border with the Komi Republic. Many swamps are along the river, which has some small tributaries. It was connected by the Northern Catherine Canal with the North Keltma, but the canal functioned for only 16 years.

References 

Rivers of Perm Krai